Minervino José Lopes Pietra (born 1 March 1954) is a former Portuguese footballer who played as a right back, and a former assistant coach of S.L. Benfica.

He appeared in 326 Primeira Liga games over the course of 16 seasons, with Belenenses and Benfica (29 goals scored). Subsequently, he became a manager, working mainly as an assistant and having spells with both clubs.

Club career
Born in Lisbon, Pietra started his professional career with local C.F. Os Belenenses, collecting nearly 150 official appearances with the first team in his five-year Primeira Liga spell and scoring ten league goals. In 1976 the 22-year-old moved to S.L. Benfica, where he would remain until his retirement.

With Benfica, Pietra won, always as an important defensive unit, the league in 1977, 1981, 1983 and 1984, adding five domestic cups. In 11 seasons he appeared in more than 300 games all competitions comprised, netting on more than 20 occasions; he also helped the club to the 1982–83 UEFA Cup final, lost to Belgium's R.S.C. Anderlecht (0–1 abroad, 1–1 at home).

In the mid-1990s, Pietra began working as a manager, successively with Boavista FC, Belenenses, Benfica, F.C. Alverca (under former Benfica teammate António Veloso, his fullback counterpart), F.C. Barreirense and G.D. Estoril Praia, the latter two as head coach. After nearly one decade out of the game he returned to Benfica in 2007, acting as match scout for two years then joining Jorge Jesus' coaching staff two years later, remaining with the side for several seasons in the latter capacity.

International career
Pietra gained 28 caps for Portugal, his first game being on 14 November 1973 in a 1–1 draw against Northern Ireland for the 1974 FIFA World Cup qualifiers, at the age of only 19. He appeared regularly during the following years, but did not attend any major international tournament.

Pietra's last match was on 21 September 1983 in a 5–0 win over Finland for the UEFA Euro 1984 qualification stages. Portugal did make it to the finals in France, but he was overlooked for the squad that eventually finished third.

|}

Honours
Benfica
 Primeira Divisão: 1976–77, 1980–81, 1982–83, 1983–84
 Taça de Portugal (5)
 Supertaça Cândido de Oliveira (2)
 Taça de Honra (2)

References

External links

1954 births
Living people
Footballers from Lisbon
Portuguese footballers
Association football defenders
Primeira Liga players
C.F. Os Belenenses players
S.L. Benfica footballers
Portugal international footballers
Portuguese football managers
Juventude Sport Clube managers
G.D. Estoril Praia managers
S.L. Benfica non-playing staff